Mazaediothecium is a genus of calicioid lichens in the family Pyrenulaceae. It has four species. The genus was circumscribed by Dutch lichenologist André Aptroot in 1991, with Mazaediothecium rubiginosum assigned as the type species.

Species
Mazaediothecium album 
Mazaediothecium mohamedii  – Malaysia
Mazaediothecium rubiginosum 
Mazaediothecium uniseptatum  – French Guiana

References

Pyrenulales
Lichen genera
Eurotiomycetes genera
Taxa named by André Aptroot
Taxa described in 1991